Ralph Rodighiero (born May 26, 1963) is an American politician who served in the West Virginia House of Delegates from the 24th district from 2014 until 2020. He also previously served in the West Virginia House of Delegates from the 19th district from 2006 to 2012.

Rodighiero was the 2020 Democratic nominee for the West Virginia State Senate 7th District which comprises Logan, Boone, Lincoln, Wayne (part), and Mingo (part) counties. He lost against former fellow Democratic turned Republican Delegate Rupie Phillips.

Elections

Personal 
Rodighiero is member of the NRA and the WVCDL.

References

1963 births
Living people
Democratic Party members of the West Virginia House of Delegates
21st-century American politicians